Mutukula may refer to several places:

Mutukula, Tanzania, a town in Kagera Region, northwestern Tanzania, on the border with Uganda
Mutukula, Uganda, a town in Rakai District, south-central Uganda, on the border with Tanzania
 Mutukula Airport, a small civilian and military airport in Uganda